Lander Euba Ziarrusta (born 15 October 1977) is a Spanish former professional road cyclist.

Major results
2001
 1st Overall Vuelta a Alava
1st Stage 2
 2nd Overall Vuelta Ciclista a León
2003
 2nd Overall Troféu Joaquim Agostinho
1st Stage 1

References

External links

1977 births
Living people
Spanish male cyclists
People from Guernica
Cyclists from the Basque Country (autonomous community)
Sportspeople from Biscay